Müntefering is a German surname. Notable people with the surname include:

 Franz Müntefering (born 1940), German politician
 Michelle Müntefering (born 1980), German politician
 Mirjam Müntefering (born 1969), German author, daughter of Franz

German-language surnames